Philautus aurifasciatus is a species of frog in the family Rhacophoridae.
It is endemic to Indonesia.

Its natural habitats are subtropical or tropical moist lowland forests and subtropical or tropical moist montane forests.
It is threatened by habitat loss.

References

Amphibians of Indonesia
aurifasciatus
Nepenthes infauna
Amphibians described in 1837
Taxonomy articles created by Polbot